The Zigen Fund promotes human-centered sustainable development. It is a U.S. registered 501(C)(3) tax-exempt non-profit organization founded by Pat Yang in 1988. A sister organization, China Zigen Rural Education and Development Association, is among the first fully registered nonprofit organization in China in 1995. The two organizations cooperate to support grassroots efforts of the impoverished people for life improvement and sustainable local development. Other Zigen sister organizations, in Taiwan (1990), Hong Kong (1992, re-registered 2009) are also locally registered as non-profit organizations. The network of Zigen organizations conduct fundraising and outreach activities locally, and collaborate on program support in China.

Initiatives
The Zigen Fund is one of six partners of China UNESCO Education for sustainable development (ESD) in training teachers and village leaders in rural China.

Since the early 1990s The Zigen Fund has been supporting programs in the education domain in rural China, particularly in providing Financial Aids programs to girls who otherwise do not have the opportunity to receive formal education. For the past 30 years, The Zigen Fund has diligently sustained its programs with no interruption, and has enabled cohorts of girls in these communities to complete their formal education, and became the first generation teachers, healthcare workers and entrepreneurs in their villages. Over the years, The Zigen Fund has also expanded its scope of programs beyond the formal educational system to include environmental awareness, primary healthcare and cultural preservation.  

Building upon the foundation and experience of the past 30 years of experience, the launch of the holistic program of Education for Sustainable Development by Zigen Fund is a natural transition, and is a much needed and urgent focus for China, as well as for the future of planet earth.

Zigen supports:

1.	Education – To provide sponsorship for basic (children) and adult education and to fund basic infrastructure for schools.

2.	Basic healthcare – To provide paramedical training programs and health clinics in rural areas.

3.	Environmentally sound technologies – To incorporate sustainable socioeconomic development to enhance the livelihood of villagers via grassroots support and environmental consciousness.

4.	Rural village development – To fund various undertakings between villagers and support cultural events.

5.	Migrant workers community – To sponsor and organize various community events and development classes for migrant workers.

6.	International partnerships – To organize multicultural educational exchange programs and promote understanding between the villagers and exchange students.

Funding

Over the past three decades, we have built trust with local villagers, teachers, parents, and officials, and have established strong networks in many rural counties in the poor provinces in China. There are four Program coordinating centers in China, supported by a central administration team in Beijing. The four centers are located in the rural areas where we have active programs: QingLong (HeBei province) [河北省, 青龍鎮], ShiLui (Xhanxi province) [山西省, 石樓県], LeiShan (Quizhou province) [貴卅省, 雷山県], and LiZhiang (Yunan province) [云南省, 麗江県 ]. Each coordinating center is staffed by resident Zigen staffs and volunteers. Projects are proposed by the local villagers and developed jointly with our local coordinators; funding proposals are reviewed by the Project Committee. Approved projects are executed by the local people, overseen and coordinated by our coordinating centers. Every year, self-funded monitoring trips are organized to enable our donors to visit the villages and inspect the programs.

The Zigen Fund relies on a wide network of volunteers in many cities and states in the United States for its fundraising, administrative and project selection, and coordination activities. In addition, some of the resources are secured through personal donations, volunteering, child sponsoring, and small business partners.

Current undertakings 

Zigen projects promote education for sustainable development (ESD) in rural China through the establishment of Green Eco Schools. This is achieved by training local primary and secondary teachers  who will return to their schools after the training to train more teachers in the development and the implementation of the curriculum to advance education for sustainable development based on their local needs. Schools that have gone through the relevant curriculum training, development, and implementation  are named Village Green-Eco Schools which will also serve as the basis or model schools for others in the possible expansion of the ESD program.

Zigen Green Ecological Schools 

China began responding to the UN call to promote green ecological schools in the 1990s, but so far, most green schools are located in cities, rural areas are ignored.

 Up to 2018, have already supported the establishment of 74 Green Eco Schools in 15 provinces and 30 counties.
 3000 rural teachers have participated in the rural teachers training program and led the students together participating in the building of Green Eco Schools.
 2016-2020 supporting the establishment of 100 village green-eco experimental schools.

Revitalizing Village: Rural sustainable Leadership Training Program 
Since 2016, Zigen has supported rural schools to participate in the Green Eco School Program through developing thematic teacher training, sponsoring schools to implement activities that are related to environmental education, local culture preservation, gender education, school-family-village engagement, collaborating with local education bureau to conduct best lesson plan selection, and to carry out county level program reflection and evaluation conference. In 2016–2019, approximately 3000 teachers from 74 rural schools in nine counties of six provinces (Yulong of Yunnan, Rongjiang of Guizhou, Qinglong, Fengning, Longyao, Baixiang of Hebei, Xinzhou of Hubei, Shilou of Shanxi, Linxi of Inner Mongolia, etc.) received systematic teacher training.

Rural Adolescent Girls Sex Health Education Teachers Training 
ZIGEN has developed a research on the female adolescent sexual health education in poor areas, which has summarized the major problems that female adolescents confront:

   (1) Lack of the fundamental knowledge, conscience and skills on health, physiological hygiene and sex, which arouse confusion, fright and inferiority when they come through physiological changes;

   (2) Situations such as puppy love, marriage and pregnancy in early age contribute to some female adolescents’ incompleteness of compulsory education;

   (3) Lack of essential sexual knowledge and the perception in self-protection increase their risk of sexual invasion;

   (4) Schools are quiet short of the teachers, textbooks and course management for adolescent sexual education;

   (5) Left-behind children are the group with high risks of sexual invasion. Because of being left behind for a long run, the vast majority of female adolescents show poor consciousness of self-protection in poor districts.

See also 
Poverty in China
List of NGOs in China
Education for sustainable development
Sex education

External links
Official Website

References

Non-profit organizations based in the United States